United States gubernatorial elections were held in 1904, in 33 states, concurrent with the House, Senate elections and presidential election, on November 8, 1904 (except in Arkansas, Georgia, Maine and Vermont, which held early elections).

In Wyoming, a special election was held following the death of Governor DeForest Richards in April 1903.

Results

See also 
1904 United States elections

References

Notes 

 
November 1904 events